Green Valley is a master planned community located in Henderson, Nevada, and Southern Nevada's first master-planned community built before Summerlin. Smaller neighborhoods called Green Valley Ranch and Green Valley South are within the boundaries of the master community. Green Valley South began construction around 1985, while Green Valley Ranch began construction in 1994. Shopping, bars, and restaurants are located at The District at Green Valley Ranch. Green Valley (North, South, and Ranch) postal codes include: all of 89074, 89014, and 89012. Green Valley Ranch extends into the eastern areas of the zip code of 89052.

History
Green Valley was developed by American Nevada Corporation, which had begun planning the community as of 1973. Green Valley's grand opening was held on October 24, 1978. Attendees included Nevada governor Mike O'Callaghan.

Master planned areas
Master planned areas of Green Valley include:
Green Valley Estates
The Village of Fox Ridge
Whitney Ranch
Hillsboro Heights
MacDonald Ranch
Sun City MacDonald Ranch
MacDonald Highlands
Ascaya
Roma Hills
Resort Villas
The Fountains
Quail Ridge
The Village of Silver Springs
The Legacy Village 
The Grand Legacy 
The Masters Series
Green Valley Ranch
Southfork
Sunridge Heights
Ventana Canyon
The Bluffs
Millwood Village
Westwood Village
Sentosa
Crown Pointe

Education 
Public education is provided by the Clark County School District. The community is home to 9 public elementary schools, 3 middle schools, and 3 high schools. Silverado High School also covers the borderline of the community, as it resides in both Green Valley and Paradise.

Elementary schools
 Selma F. Bartlett Elementary School
 James Gibson Elementary School
Nate Mack Elementary School
Estes M. McDoniel Elementary School
Glen C. Taylor Elementary School
Jim Thorpe Elementary School
Harriet A. Treem Elementary School
Neil C. Twitchell Elementary School
John C. Vanderburg Elementary School

Middle schools
Francis H. Cortney Junior High School
Barbara & Hank Greenspun Junior High School
Bob Miller Middle School
Thurman White Middle School

High schools

Coronado High School
Green Valley High School
Southeast Career & Technical Academy

Shopping 
The District at Green Valley Ranch, a mixed-use development center.
Galleria at Sunset, a shopping mall.
Galleria Shopping District

References 

Geography of Henderson, Nevada
Populated places established in 1978
Planned communities in Clark County, Nevada